The Valiant class were a class of nuclear-powered fleet submarines in service with the Royal Navy from the mid-1960s until 1994. They were the first fully British nuclear fleet submarine; the earlier  used an American nuclear reactor. There were only two boats in the class, the first, Valiant (the nameship) commissioned in 1966 three years after Dreadnought, and Warspite the following year. Both were built by Vickers at Barrow-in-Furness.

Design

The class were based on Dreadnought, but were enlarged by 20 feet (6 m) and had a dived displacement of 4,900 tons compared to 4,000 tons. Improvements made since the original Dreadnought meant that they ran significantly quieter under main power, and also had a Paxman diesel-electric generator that could be used for silent running. In most other respects (outside the power plant), the Valiants were identical to Dreadnought.

According to former head of the Royal Corps of Naval Constructors R.J. Daniel, when US Admiral Hyman G. Rickover, widely regarded as the father of the nuclear submarine, initially learned of the proposed rafting system for the Valiant class, (in which ship's machinery is acoustically isolated from the hull by padding known as "rafts"), he was dismissive of the concept, with the result that the Royal Navy gained an advantage in submarine silencing that the United States Navy did not introduce until considerably later.

The Valiants were primarily used in the anti-submarine role, important during the Cold War. In 1967 Valiant set a Royal Navy (RN) record of sailing 12,000 miles (19,312 km) submerged in twenty-eight days, from Singapore to the UK. Both boats received a number of refits, including the capability to use the Harpoon missile. Valiant and other nuclear fleet submarines served in the Falklands War in 1982.

The Valiants had long careers: Warspite was decommissioned in 1991, and Valiant in 1994, due to cracks being discovered in her primary to secondary cooling system. They were very successful and served as the template for the  ballistic missile submarine and subsequent  fleet submarines.

Construction Programme

See also
List of submarines of the Royal Navy

References

Cited footnotes

Cited texts

 The Encyclopedia of Warships, From World War Two to the Present Day, General Editor Robert Jackson

Nuclear submarines of the Royal Navy